The Lotus 63 was an experimental Formula One car using four-wheel drive, designed by Colin Chapman and Maurice Philippe for the 1969 season. Chapman's reasoning behind the car was that the 3 litre engines introduced in 1966 would be better served by building a car that could take full advantage of its power while retaining the Lotus 49's simplicity.

Development
Like the Lotus 56 for the Indy 500 (and later F1), the 63 chassis was designed around a four wheel drive system. This was not totally revolutionary at the time, as four wheel drive had been used on the Ferguson P99 F1 car that won at Oulton Park as early as 1961, but with little development thereafter. 

However, it was not a successful design. In fact, the Matra MS84 was the only 4WD F1 which scored points (driven by Johnny Servoz-Gavin, at the 1969 Canadian Grand Prix) something neither Lotus nor McLaren managed, while Cosworth did not even race their 4WD design. The 63 was an evolution of the 49, but featured wedge shaped rear bodywork and integrated wings, which would be used to great effect in the Lotus 72.

Racing history 

John Miles, Lotus' third driver, was entrusted with the task of developing the car, while Graham Hill and Jochen Rindt used the 49 in the early races of 1969. The 63 proved difficult to drive and set up, and the four wheel drive system was especially problematic. After a single test run, Hill flatly refused to drive the car again stating it was a 'deathtrap,' as did Rindt, who agreed with Hill after taking the car to its best result, 2nd in the non-championship Oulton Park Gold Cup. This infuriated Chapman as he saw the 63 as another quantum leap ahead of its rivals, just as its predecessors had been.

The car was entered at the 1969 British Grand Prix as a test run. Whilst Rindt finished fourth in the older 49 behind Jackie Stewart after running short of fuel whilst leading, Miles could only bring the 63 home in 10th place, confirming the car's uncompetitiveness. After several other fruitless outings, the 63 was abandoned.

Aftermath 
Parts of the chassis design were worked into the Lotus 72, which debuted in 1970, and four wheel drive technology returned into F1 with the Lotus 56B in 1971.

Like the Lotus 88, the 4WD cars proved to be huge white elephants for Lotus, but it paved the way for better models to follow.

Complete Formula One World Championship results
(key) (results in bold indicate pole position; results in italics indicate fastest lap)

 All Points Scored by the Lotus 49

Non-Championship Formula One results
(key)

References

63
1969 Formula One season cars
All-wheel-drive vehicles